The Iron Shield Society (formerly the Iron Cross Society) is an exclusive undergraduate honors society at the University of Wisconsin–Madison.

The student organization was historically a secret society but the existence of the organization is now public and its members are publicly identified on their web site. Society inductees who have graduated are also honored by having their names listed at the Memorial Union.

History 
The Iron Shield Society was founded in 1902. The most visible accomplishment of Iron Shield is the founding of the Memorial Union. In 1907, the UW–Madison president asked Iron Shield members to help convert the failing Madison YMCA into a more meaningful student institution.

Initially only open to men in their senior year of college, The Iron Shield later allowed both juniors and women to join.

In 2011, the Iron Shield published an endorsement of the Wisconsin Idea in the Badger Herald. The open letter exhorted students to not just plug themselves into existing community organizations, but to also think critically about which of their community's needs are not currently being met and how the skills learned in college could help students address those needs.

In 2020, the organization made the decision to change its name from the Iron Cross Society to the Iron Shield Society to remove potential confusion of association with the  Nazi Iron Cross or Neo-Nazi organizations using the "Iron Cross" name.

Selection process 
Unlike other UW–Madison honor societies, faculty, academic staff, student leaders, and student organizations all make nominations to the Iron Shield Society. The exact selection process is not known, but students' extracurricular, community accomplishments, and (to a lesser extent) GPA is taken into consideration. Nominations can be made via online form.

Notable alumni 
Professor Kathy Cramer '94
Senator Russ Feingold '75
Former UW Athletic Director Pat Richter '63
Former Wisconsin Supreme Court Chief Justice Nathan Heffernan '42
Former President and CEO of Campbell Soup Company William Beverly Murphy '28

See also
Collegiate secret societies in North America
University of Wisconsin–Madison

References

External links
The Iron Shield Society
Old website for the Iron Shield Society 
"What is the Iron Cross Society?" on the Wisconsin Union Blog
Ask Abe Q&A on the Iron Shield Society

University of Wisconsin–Madison
Honor societies
Collegiate secret societies